Isaac B. Wall (1823 - 1855) was a Democratic politician from California who is best known for serving in the California State Assembly from the 5th and 6th districts from 1851 to 1853. He served as Speaker of the Assembly in 1853. After leaving the California State Assembly, Wall became the customs collector for the port of Monterey, California between 1853 and 1855. He was killed in a robbery near what is now  Chualar, California on November 11, 1855.

References 

1823 births
1855 deaths
Speakers of the California State Assembly